Viewfield is an unincorporated community in Meade County, South Dakota, United States.

Panoramic views over the surrounding fields can be had from the town site, hence the name.

Notable person
Walter Dale Miller, 29th Governor of South Dakota, was born in Viewfield.

Notes

Unincorporated communities in Meade County, South Dakota
Unincorporated communities in South Dakota